"Cochranella" riveroi is a species of frog in the family Centrolenidae. It is endemic to Cerro Aracamuni, Venezuela. The generic placement of this species within the subfamily Centroleninae is uncertain (incertae sedis ).

Taxonomy and systematics
This species was originally described as Centrolenella riveroi. However, most subsequent studies have placed it in the genus Cochranella. A study published in 2002 suggested that it belongs to the Cochranella spinosa group. However, morphological data do not allow unambiguous generic placement. With no molecular data available, it is—for the time being—retained in Cochranella.

Description
Two adult males measured  while a single female measured  in snout–vent length; the female had 21 eggs  in diameter in her ovaries. The tympanum is visible. The fingers are slightly webbed and the toes moderately webbed. The dorsal skin is strongly granular. The coloration of living specimens is unknown.

Habitat and conservation
The vegetation at the summit is mostly low (<1 m), with forested areas in depressions and along streams.

There are no known threats to this species, although its small range makes it vulnerable (Cerro Aracamuni is a tepui with a relatively small summit). It occurs in the Serranía de la Neblina National Park.

References

Glass frogs
Amphibians of Venezuela
Endemic fauna of Venezuela
Amphibians described in 1992
Taxonomy articles created by Polbot
Taxa named by José Ayarzagüena
Amphibians of the Tepuis